Christopher Gregory Malkin (born 4 June 1967) is an English former professional footballer who played as a centre-forward.

Malkin began his professional career at Tranmere Rovers, whom he joined from Stork on a free transfer in 1987. He spent eight years at Prenton Park, forming a successful partnership with John Aldridge upon his arrival from Real Sociedad in 1991, halfway through Malkin's stay on the Wirral. A couple of months earlier Malkin scored the winning goal at Wembley Stadium to win the Division Three play-off final against Bolton Wanderers. At Tranmere he was also part of the side that won the 1989-90 Football League Trophy.

After over 200 league appearances and 60 goals for Rovers, Malkin joined Millwall in 1995 for a £400,000 price tag. In fifteen months at the Den, he scored thirteen goals in a half-century of league appearances for the Lions.

In 1996, Malkin moved back north, joining Gary Megson's Blackpool for £275,000, becoming the Seasiders' record signing (which he remained until 2008). An injury-prone period at Bloomfield Road meant he made only 65 league appearances and scored six goals for the Lancashire club in just under three years.

Blackpool didn't receive any return on their record outlay when, in August 1999, Nigel Worthington let the forward join Telford United on a free transfer.

Malkin joined Chester City as player-physio in 2001, and a year later moved to Oswestry Town, with whom he finished his career.

Malkin now works as a physiotherapist at Spire Murrayfield Hospital in Wirral, helping patients back to fitness. He previously had spells as club physio for Aston Villa and Nottingham Forest.

References

External links

1967 births
Living people
People from Bebington
English footballers
Tranmere Rovers F.C. players
Millwall F.C. players
Blackpool F.C. players
Telford United F.C. players
Chester City F.C. players
Oswestry Town F.C. players
English Football League players
National League (English football) players
Association football forwards
Chester City F.C. non-playing staff
Association football physiotherapists